Helena Carrión is a Spanish actress. She has appeared in films such as Marujas asesinas (2001), La novia de Lázaro (2002), Crimen Ferpecto (2004), Entre vivir y soñar (2004), La caja Kovak (2005),
La habitación de Fermat (2007), ¡Mano muerta llama a la puerta! (TV) (2008), Rivales (2008)  and Proyecto Dos (2008).

References

External links

Spanish film actresses
Living people
Year of birth missing (living people)